Tickmacrevan is a civil parish in County Antrim, Northern Ireland. It is situated in the historic barony of Glenarm Lower.

Civil parish of Tickmacrevan
The civil parish includes the villages of Carnlough and Glenarm.

Townlands
The civil parish contains the following townlands:

Aughaboy
Aughareamlagh
Ault (also known as Gowkstown)
Ballyvaddy
Bay
Bellair
Burns Libbert
Carnalbanagh
Carnave
Carrive
Clady
Cregcattan, part of Galdanagh
Deer Park Farms
Deer Park Great
Deer Park Little
Demesne Upper
Dickey's Town
Doonan
Drumcrow
Druminagh
Drumnacole
Drumourne
Dunarragan
Dunteige
Galdanagh
Gartford
Glebe
Glenarm Demesne
Glore
Gortcarney
Gowkstown (also known as Ault)
Harphall
Libbert East
Libbert West
Longfield
Minnis North
Mullaghconnelly
Munie North
Munie South
Old Church
Owencloghy
Parishagh
Stony Hill
Town Parks
Tully
Unshinagh Mountain
Unshinagh North
Unshinagh South

See also 
List of townlands in County Antrim
List of civil parishes of County Antrim

References